Pierre Peinaud (9 February 1890 – 12 June 1962) was a French cyclist. He competed in two events at the 1912 Summer Olympics.

References

External links
 

1890 births
1962 deaths
French male cyclists
Olympic cyclists of France
Cyclists at the 1912 Summer Olympics
People from Vichy
Sportspeople from Allier
Cyclists from Auvergne-Rhône-Alpes